Thomas John Treloar (1 August 1892 – 15 November 1953) was an Australian politician. Born in Tamworth, New South Wales, he was educated at Sydney Grammar School before returning to Tamworth as a shopkeeper. He eventually became a company director before serving in World War I 1915–18 and World War II 1942–46. In 1949, he was elected to the Australian House of Representatives as the Country Party member for Gwydir, defeating Labor minister William Scully. He died in 1953, necessitating a by-election for his seat.

References

National Party of Australia members of the Parliament of Australia
Members of the Australian House of Representatives for Gwydir
Members of the Australian House of Representatives
1892 births
1953 deaths
20th-century Australian politicians